...Magni blandinn ok megintiri... (Old Norse, "...Mixed with might and great fame...", a quote from the poem Sigrdrifumál) is the second studio album by the German Viking metal band Falkenbach. It was recorded at Blue House Studios in Germany. The album was re-released as a limited vinyl LP (1,000 copies) on Skaldic Art Productions in 2002.

Track listing

Personnel
 Vratyas Vakyas - all instruments, vocals, layout
 Christophe Szpajdel - logo

Falkenbach albums
1998 albums
Napalm Records albums